The 1976 season of 2. deild karla was the 11th season of third-tier football in Iceland.

Group A

Group B

Group C

Group D

Group E

Group F

Group G

Final round

Group A

Group B

Finals

1st place

Reynir S. was promoted straight after these games to the 1977 1. deild. Afturelding had to enter a three-team playoff with the team in 3rd place (Þróttur N.) and the bottom team of the 1976 1. deild karla, (Reynir Á.).

3rd place

Playoff round for two 1. deild places

Reynir S. and Þróttur N. won promotion to the 1977 1. deild karla. Reynir Á. avoided relegation from the 1. deild.

References
 

2. deild karla seasons
Iceland
Iceland
3